Kingsmead School is a mixed secondary school and sixth form located in Enfield, north London, England.

The school converted to academy status in October 2010, and was previously a community school under the direct control of Enfield London Borough Council.

The 2017 results were in the highest possible category of ‘Well Above Average’ at A Level (top 4% nationally) and ‘Above Average’ at GCSE (top 18% nationally).

Kingsmead had a poor reputation until the early 2000s, when it began to rapidly improve. It has consistently produced above national average outcomes for students over a number of years.

In 2006, Kingsmead became a specialist arts college in the visual and performing arts.

In 2007, Kingsmead School was the first school in Enfield to be rated 'outstanding' in all categories assessed by Ofsted after a new rating system was introduced. In 2008, students from the school appeared in the Sky1 television series Hairspray: The School Musical. Giles Bird, a former headteacher, was also appointed a CBE for services to education carried out on behalf of the organisation ASCL.

In 2012, the Lord Hill of Oareford, Leader of the House of Lords visited the school, stating he was impressed with the "vibrant teaching and learning environment". Later, Nick de Bois also visited the school after it became one of the first schools in the United Kingdom to achieve academy status.

In 2013 and 2016 the school received the overall rating of 'Good' Ofsted inspections under new inspection frameworks.

In 2018 81% of GCSE students were entered for the Ebacc subjects, when the government target is for 75% of students to be entered by 2022.

Since September 2017 the school has had a new Headteacher, David Medway.

Notable former pupils
Jessie Wallace (1982-1986), actress known for her portrayal as Kat Slater in the BBC soap opera EastEnders.

References

External links
Kingsmead School official website

Enfield, London
Secondary schools in the London Borough of Enfield
Academies in the London Borough of Enfield
Specialist arts colleges in England